Leon, officially the Municipality of Leon,  is a 2nd class municipality in the province of Iloilo, Philippines. According to the 2020 census, it has a population of 51,990 people.

It is known as the "Vegetable Basket of Iloilo Province" due to its supply of asparagus, cabbages, baguio beans, sayote, eggplants, carrots and other vegetables.

A popular tourist attraction in the municipality is the Bucari Mountain Range, which is known as the Summer Capital of Iloilo and Vegetable Garden of Iloilo.

Geography

Barangays

Leon is politically subdivided into 85 barangays.

Climate

Demographics

Economy

References

External links

 Municipal Government Website
 [ Philippine Standard Geographic Code]
 Philippine Census Information
 Local Governance Performance Management System

Municipalities of Iloilo